Ahn Hee-yeon (Hangul: 안희연; born May 1, 1992), professionally known as Hani, is a South Korean singer and actress. She is known as a member of the South Korean girl group EXID and its subgroup, SoljiHani (formerly known as Dasoni (Hangul: 다소니)). She has appeared on television as a host on Weekly Idol and a cast member on Off to School, Crime Scene and A Style for You.

Early life
Ahn Hee-yeon was born on May 1, 1992, in Seoul, South Korea, but her family and friends all called her Hani from a young age. She competed in triathlons from elementary until middle school, and was also an avid swimmer. She is the sister of actor Ahn Tae Hwan.

Prior to her debut with EXID, she was originally set to debut as a member of a girl group under JYP Entertainment, along with Sistar's Hyolyn, Secret's Song Ji-eun and Bestie's Uji. However, she was cut from JYP after a year. Hani stated that the company did not see potential in her. Following this, she went to study abroad in China for a year.

Career

2012–13: Debut with EXID and rise to popularity
EXID officially debuted on February 15, 2012, with the release of their debut single, "Whoz That Girl".

In February 2013, Hani and EXID member Heo Sol-ji formed  the duo Dasoni and released their debut single "Goodbye" on February 15, 2013. It also included the B-side, "Said So Often".

In August 2014, EXID released their single "Up & Down". Initially, the song charted poorly, failing to make it on the top 100 of the Gaon Chart. However, the song slowly gained popularity in late November after a fan-taken video of Hani performing the song went viral. As of 2019, the video has been viewed more than 30 million times on YouTube.

2014–present: Solo career

In 2014, she entered the main cast of tvN's Always Cantare.

In 2015, she appeared in Mad Clown's music video for "Fire", and entered the main cast of JTBC's Off to School and Crime Scene. Hani was also chosen to present a new KBS beauty show, A Style For You along with Kim Heechul, Goo Ha-ra and Yoon Bora. In spring, she appeared on Soulmates Returns. Later on, she made a cameo appearance in The Producers as herself. On June 24, she and Ken of VIXX released a duet song titled "Gap". In September, she was made a cast member in TV series Law of the Jungle.

In 2016, Hani became the co-host of Baek Jong-won's Three Great Emperors. In February 2016, she appeared on King of Mask Singer as "Little Match Girl", a get-up completed with a mask and costumes to hide her identity. Hani surprised the panel of judges and an audience with her rich and husky voice (mostly due to the higher vocal range used as a vocalist in EXID). Hani defeated Kim Feel and Jo Hang-jo but she was subsequently defeated by the Mask King at the time, Ha Hyun-woo of Guckkasten. Nevertheless, Hani's performances attracted attention and recognition for her unique vocal and passion for singing.

On January 12, 2017, it was announced that f(x)'s Luna, Hani, and Mamamoo's Solar would release a collaborative dance song on January 19, produced by Park Geun-tae, who also wrote EXO's Baekhyun and Miss A's Suzy's duet "Dream". It was later revealed that the song's title is "Honey Bee", and is of the pop soul genre, incorporating 808 bass and saxophone. On January 19, the song "Honey Bee" was officially released on Mystic Entertainment's YouTube channel.

In May 2019, Banana Culture announced that Hani and Jeonghwa would not be renewing their contracts, and EXID would go on hiatus after finishing their tour in Japan.

In October 2019 it was announced that Hani has signed with Sublime Artist Agency and that she would be making her film debut with her given name Ahn Hee-yeon.

On January 21, 2020, Hani was announced to star in the web drama XX. The drama's first episode aired on January 24 and ran for 10 episodes.

On August 11, 2020, Hani was announced to be starring in another web drama, How to Be Thirty, alongside Jung In-sun, Kang Min-hyuk, Song Jae-rim, Cha Min-ji, and Baek Sung-chul. It premiered on KakaoTV on February 23, 2021, with new episodes being released every Tuesday and Friday.

On July 20, 2021, Hani was set to star in JTBC's upcoming series, Idol: The Coup, but due to her being tested positive for COVID-19, production was postponed until further notice. The drama is scheduled to air starting on November 8, 2021.

Personal life 
On June 29, 2022, the agency confirmed that she is in a relationship with psychiatrist Yang Jae-woong, for 2 years.

Discography

Filmography

Film

Television series

Web series

Television shows

Web shows

Awards and nominations

Listicles

References

External links

 

1992 births
Living people
People from Seoul
K-pop singers
South Korean female idols
South Korean women pop singers
South Korean dance musicians
South Korean television personalities
South Korean web series actresses
Mandarin-language singers of South Korea
EXID members
Weekly Idol members